Prasophyllum canaliculatum, commonly known as the channelled leek orchid or summer leek orchid, is a species of orchid endemic to a small area of southern New South Wales. It has a single tubular, bright green leaf and up to twenty five scented, greenish-red or brownish flowers on a flowering stem. It grows in woodland at altitudes around  where only about two hundred plants survive.

Description
As with others in the genus, the flowers are inverted so that the labellum is above the column rather than below it. The edges of the labellum are flared and there is a green to reddish channelled callus in its centre. Flowering occurs from December to January.

Taxonomy and naming
Prasophyllum canaliculatum was first formally described in 1989 by David Jones from a specimen collected in the Wadbilliga National Park and the description was published in The Orchadian. The specific epithet (canaliculatum) is a Latin word meaning "channelled' or "grooved".

Distribution and habitat
The summer leek orchid is only known from two populations on the Monaro tableland.

Conservation
Only about 200 plants of P. canaliculatum are known to survive and the species is classified as "Critically Endangered" (CR) under the New South Wales Government Threatened Species Conservation Act 1995. The main threats to the population are the activities of feral pigs and deer, weed invasion and illegal off-road vehicle traffic.

References

External links 
 
 

canaliculatum
Flora of New South Wales
Endemic orchids of Australia
Plants described in 1989